Addepar, Inc. is an American wealth management platform for registered investment advisors, specializing in data aggregation, analytics, and portfolio reporting.

Origin 
In 2004, Peter Thiel founded Palantir Technologies along with several others, including Joe Lonsdale.  In 2009, Lonsdale stopped working full-time at Palantir to launch Addepar with Jason Mirra, another Palantir employee.  In 2012, Addepar expanded its target clients to include registered investment advisers (RIAs) and initiated a sales and marketing effort to attract larger clients. In 2013, Addepar focused on expanding risk analytics and their client portal.

Management transition 
In 2013, Addepar hired a head of sales from Advent (Black Diamond). During 2013, Addepar's primary competitors Black Diamond, Tamarac and Orion "pulled away in the battle for RIA market share, with each of the brands adding about 50% to their asset administration totals". In 2013, Addepar sought to transition out of start-up mode, replacing Lonsdale with new CEO Eric Poirier previously of Palantir and hiring a COO to start building out the company's management.

Funding and expansion 
In 2017, Addepar received a $140 million round of funding from Valor Equity Partners. The same year, Addepar partnered with Morgan Stanley, providing software that consolidated information and tailored reporting about the assets of high net-worth Morgan Stanley clients.

In May 2017, Addepar acquired AltX, a machine learning platform aimed at alternative investments.

In 2019, Addepar hired six new executives to the company's team and launched a mobile app for its portfolio management software.

Products and services 
Addepar's platform provides analytics and performance analysis of portfolios and market data with software for managing high-net-worth and ultra-high-net-worth clients.

Its technology involves a mixture of proprietary and open-source software. The web frontend runs on Node.js and is developed with Ember, Lodash, QUnit, and D3. Addepar's backend services run primarily on Java, with Jetty and Jersey.

Platform 
The first algorithms for the Addepar platform were collaborated on by early Palantir employees.

In 2012, Fortune described Addepar as a service for connecting family offices and endowments to their respective investment managers and third parties managing their assets. Addepar software facilitates both visualizing an investment portfolio's exposures at the individual asset class and also tabulating the portfolio's total value according to real time value of the assets under management. The Wall Street Journal described the Addepar platform as providing investment advisors "a dashboard to track the performance of many types of asset classes in one place."  In April 2015, Addepar released a fully browser-based version of the platform.

Open API
In September 2016, Salesforce.com announced their partnership with Addepar for Salesforce's Wave Financial Services Cloud for financial advisers, making it easier to see across asset classes and produce a single visual for their clients. One month later, Addepar released their Open API to provide "a programmatic solution to tie Addepar’s data and calculations into a multitude of other products and systems."

Criticism and controversy

Housing benefits program 
Addepar, Palantir, Facebook, and Salesforce.com have been criticized for their programs to pay employees to live closer to their headquarters to encourage employees to spend more time at work; Facebook offered a one-time payment of $10,000 and Addepar offered $300 per month. John Liotti, chief executive officer of East Palo Alto community advocacy group Able Works expressed concern that this will contribute to gentrification of neighborhoods.

References

External links
 Official website

Software companies based in California
Financial software companies
Companies based in Mountain View, California
2009 establishments in California
Software companies established in 2009